Frank William Kuchta (September 18, 1936 – November 24, 2017) was an American gridiron football center and linebacker in the National Football League (NFL) for the Washington Redskins.  He was also among the players of the inaugural Denver Broncos team in the American Football League (AFL).

He played college football at the University of Notre Dame and was drafted in the ninth round of the 1958 NFL Draft.  During his career at the University of Notre Dame he played in the historic 1957 Notre Dame vs the University of Oklahoma game where the Irish broke Oklahoma's 47-game winning streak—a streak which stands to this day. He made a crucial tackle to help win the game and was awarded AP Lineman of the Week.

After leaving the NFL he played for a season with the Calgary Stampeders in the Canadian Football League (CFL).

References 

1936 births
2017 deaths
American football centers
American players of Canadian football
Calgary Stampeders players
Canadian football offensive linemen
Denver Broncos (AFL) players
Notre Dame Fighting Irish football players
Washington Redskins players
Players of American football from Cleveland
Players of Canadian football from Cleveland